Sigmund von Hochenwarth (1745 Stein, Krain - 22 April 1822, Linz) was an Austrian botanist and entomologist.
von Hochenwarth was a  Domherr in Gurk, Carinthia.
He described Ibalia leucospoides. 
He wrote:

Hochenwarth, S. von 1785, Beyträge zur Insectengeschichte. Schriften der Berlinischen Gesellschaft Naturforschender Freunde, Berlin 6:334-360, plates 7-8	   	
Hochenwarth, S. von 1785, Beyträge zur Insectengeschichte. Bibl. Ent. 1:176
Reiner, J. and Hohenwarth, S. 1792-1812: Botanische Reisen nach einigen Oberkärntnerischen und benachbarten Alpen unternommen ... nebst entomologischen Beiträgen. - Klagenfurt, Walliser 2 Bände: ?

References

Austrian naturalists
 Austrian entomologists
1822 deaths
1745 births